Florent Aziri (born 3 September 1988) is a German professional footballer who plays for SV Hemelingen. He mainly operates as a wide midfielder, usually on the right, but he has also played in more advanced roles as a winger and striker.

Career
Aziri was born in Titova Mitrovica, SFR Yugoslavia.

KF Tirana
He signed for Albanian Superliga side KF Tirana in the closing hours of the January transfer window of 2012 as a free agent. He hoped the move to Albania's most successful club will help his chances of breaking into the Albania national team.

He scored on his debut with the club against Kastrioti Kruje in the Albanian Cup on 4 February, coming on as a substitute at half time for Nertil Ferraj. He played well on the left flank, causing many problems for the Kastrioti defenders with his dangerous crosses in the area, before eventually scoring in the dying minutes of the game to finish off an impressive debut in Albanian football.

References

External links
 

1988 births
Living people
Sportspeople from Mitrovica, Kosovo
Association football midfielders
German footballers
Kosovan footballers
FC Oberneuland players
VfB Lübeck players
KF Trepça players
NK Domžale players
KF Tirana players
Besa Kavajë players
VfB Oldenburg players
Bremer SV players
Kosovan expatriate footballers
Kosovan expatriate sportspeople in Slovenia
Expatriate footballers in Slovenia
Kosovan expatriate sportspeople in Albania
Expatriate footballers in Albania